Proletariat, Inc. is an American video game developer based in Boston, Massachusetts. Founded by Seth Sivak and former Zynga industry veterans in 2012. The company was acquired by Blizzard Entertainment in 2022. Proletariat, Inc. has developed multiple independent games and launched its best-known game, Spellbreak in September, 2020.

History 
After Zynga closed its Boston studio in October 2012, Seth Sivak and four other former developers at Boston Zynga formed a new independent studio, Proletariat Inc.

The company's first major release was World Zombination, a horde-based real-time strategy mobile game. The studio raised $6 million from venture investors to finish the game. Development of the game started in April 2013. The game was ultimately released in February 2015 for Android and iOS.

In 2019, Proletariat Inc. announced the completion of $20 million in Series C funding from investors including Spark Capital, FirstMark Capital and Take-Two Interactive to grow and expand its development team. Alongside funding, Take-Two Interactive's head of corporate development and independent publishing, Michael Worosz, joined Proletariat's board of directors in 2019.

Proletariat moved from mobile games to PC titles with fast-paced arena game Streamline, full live streaming integration that allowed Viewers to interact with and control what is displayed on the screen on Twitch, it was released by Proletariat in 2016. The company then developed Spellbreak, a free-to-play multiplayer action spelling game released on Microsoft Windows, PlayStation 4, Xbox One and Nintendo Switch in 2020.

In June 2022, Proletariat, Inc. announced that the company will end development of Spellbreak and shut down the game servers in 2023. The next day, Blizzard Entertainment announced they had entered into an agreement to acquire Proletariat, Inc., and the studio will be assigned to work on World of Warcraft, beginning with the upcoming ninth expansion, Dragonflight.

Games developed

References

External links 

 

Blizzard Entertainment
2012 establishments in Massachusetts
Companies based in Boston
Video game companies established in 2012
Video game development companies
Video game companies of the United States
2022 mergers and acquisitions